EPESI BIM (Business Information Manager) is a web based, cloud-native CRM/ERP application to store, organize, access and share business records. Manage your data precisely, flexibly and easily, simplifying internal communication and making work-flow more efficient. Epesi has been designed as a Kickstarter project and provides "no code" and "low code" environment for developers. Epesi is an open-source, PHP/Ajax framework for rapid development of web-based, database-driven single page applications. The framework includes the Epesi CRM (customer relationship management) multi-user application. It requires PHP 7.x and MySQL or PostgreSQL database server on the server-side and can be accessed using any modern browser. Epesi framework and Epesi CRM application are released under MIT license.

History 
Between 1995 and 2006, Teknaspan Corporation, a small IT consulting company run by Janusz Tylek, was providing computer-related services in the Greater Philadelphia metropolitan area. Many of its customers mostly small, local companies  were looking to share easily information, especially in remote offices. Setup based on Microsoft's Exchange Server, Outlook and SharePoint was too expensive and difficult to set up and manage and did not meet with a good response.

In the same time period, Internet connection became a norm and mature, free and open source software like Apache, MySQL and PHP became available. Teknaspan started offering open source solutions to its customers, among them SugarCRM. This application was difficult to set up, upgrade and most of all  difficult to extend its functionality. After experimenting with a number of other solutions like dotproject, mantis, and many other open source solutions, it became clear that there is a need for a modern framework with a set of reusable components upon which an application can be developed.

At the beginning of 2006, Teknaspan Corporation was acquired by another IT consulting company. Janusz Tylek left Teknaspan and formed Telaxus LLC, a small software startup company focusing on the development of web-based applications. The framework using the latest standards like AJAX, HTML5 and CSS3 was born.

The original requirements were:
 100% web-based (no client installation needed)
 run on any web server (Apache, IIS, Microsoft Windows, Linux  LAMP/WAMP stack)
 use the most popular web scripting language supported  PHP
 provide a database abstraction layer  AdoDB, which has drivers for MySQL, PostgreSQL and many others
 include authentication and permission library  phpGACL
 have a set of reusable components (modules)
 use of other open-source application (for example Roundcube as an e-mail client)

In the summer of 2006, the work on the framework started after a meeting of Tylek (jasiek) and Pawel Bukowski (shacky), who designed the first set of modules. By the end of 2006, the first commercial application was released  a warehouse management system. In May 2007, the core of Epesi framework was released as open-source software and published on SourceForge. It included Record Browser  CRUD engine, designed by Arkadiusz Bisaga (ethnar), which is a high-level database abstraction layer, handling not only Create/Read/Update/Delete operations, but also automatic pagination, lazy delete, full record history, sorting, filtering and more. During the next twelve months, the application was expanded with customer relationship management (CRM) functionality and this package is now available as EPESI, an alternative to products like SugarCRM or vtiger.

From November, 2012 Epesi can be installed with Softaculous Autoinstaller 

In August 2013 EPESI was added to Enterprise-Ready Open Source Projects on Source Forge  and ranks as one of the top CRM and ERP applications with 5 star rating.

In media 
 Top Open Source Customer Relationship Management Software for Small and Medium Business 
 Best Open Source CRM Systems, Prices and Tools 
 Epesi is one of the top 12 open source CRM software by "Cost-Effective Software Reviews"

Screenshots 

Dashboard
Calendar
Record browser

Features 
EPESI framework takes advantage of some third-party libraries like database driver ADOdb or jQuery. The framework allows the development of new modules, especially when utilizing Record Browser  a module that automatically generates views, limits queries, stores historical data, etc.

The dashboard approach allows every user to customize his or her workspace using applets  a mini view of data stored in the module. For example, an applet may show only phone calls to be returned today.

A distinct feature is the Watchdog utility, which allows a user to subscribe to a record (or category of records) and have the system monitor it for you. This way a user receives a notification (Subscriptions applet) when a record was changed by another user  a meeting was canceled, a phone number or an address was updated, a project status changed from Completed to Billed or even when a note was attached to a record.

Every record can have an unlimited number of notes or attachments in any possible format.

EPESI incorporates Roundcube IMAP e-mail client and provides single instance message archiving. When a user receives an e-mail it can be archived into epesi system. An e-mail message is extracted from the e-mail client and stored in the database in the e-mails table. Attachments are stored as files with reference links. Then a link to this e-mail (or e-mail with attachments) is created under the history of two contacts: a sender and a recipient. This way the e-mail becomes a public note for all users to see. This reduces e-mail traffic - instead of forwarding coworkers, an e-mail with attachment resulting in wasted space a single instance of this e-mail is sufficient. Additionally, reference links can be created in as many modules as needed (for example, a meeting or a task can have reference links to this e-mail).

Versions 
EPESI is available as an open-source application and distributed free of charge. The base version includes the Epesi framework and set of modules providing CRM functionality:
 Dashboard
 Shared addressbook (Companies and Contacts)
 Shared calendar
 Task list (To Do)
 Phone Call tracker
 Project tracker with Bugtracker
 Sales Tracking
 Integrated e-mail client (Roundcube)

The functionality of Epesi can be extended with Custom modules (created by end-users for example) or by installing additional Premium modules. Most Premium modules are commercial and require a license fee.

See also 
 SugarCRM
 CiviCRM
 Web application
 Comparison of CRM systems
 List of ERP software packages
 List of commercial open-source applications and services

References

External links 
 
 Github Repository
 Documentation
 Support forum
 Epesi CRM as SaaS

Free ERP software
ERP software
PHP software
Customer relationship management software
2003 software
Free customer relationship management software
Free accounting software
Enterprise resource planning software for Linux